Gargi Bhogle (born 20 April 2003) is an American cricketer who plays for the United States women's national cricket team.

In September 2021, Chaudhary was named in the American Women's Twenty20 International (WT20I) team for the 2021 ICC Women's T20 World Cup Americas Qualifier tournament in Mexico. She made her WT20I debut on 18 October 2021, in the opening match of the tournament against Brazil. The following month, she was also named in America's squad for the 2021 Women's Cricket World Cup Qualifier tournament in Zimbabwe. On 23 November 2021, she played in America's first match of the tournament, against Bangladesh.

References

External links

2003 births
Living people
Cricketers from Mumbai
Indian emigrants to the United States
American people of Marathi descent
American sportspeople of Indian descent
American women cricketers
United States women Twenty20 International cricketers